Colin Sheppard, usually cited as C. J. R. Sheppard, is senior scientist at the Italian Institute of Technology, Genoa, Italy. Previously, he was professor in the Department of Bioengineering and Faculty of Engineering for National University of Singapore (2003–2012). He has held joint appointments with the NUS Departments of Biological Sciences (Faculty of Science) and Diagnostic Radiology (School of Medicine). He was SMART (Singapore/MIT Alliance for Research & Technology) Faculty Fellow, and Adjunct Research Staff at SERI (Singapore Eye Research Institute).

His areas of research are in optics, microscopy and imaging, including confocal and multiphoton microscopy, diffraction, 3D imaging and reconstruction, superresolution, beam propagation, and pulse propagation.

Education and position
He received the MA and PhD degrees in Engineering from University of Cambridge (1972 and 1973), and a DSc in Physical Sciences from the University of Oxford (1986).

He held a Science & Engineering Research Council Advanced Fellowship (1974–6) and was University Lecturer in Engineering Science at Oxford University (1979–89). He was Junior Research Fellow of St John's College, Oxford (1975–8) and Fellow of Pembroke College, Oxford University (1979–89). He was professor of physics at the University of Sydney (1989–2003), and research director of the Australian Key Centre for Microscopy & Microanalysis (1995–2001).

He is Supernumerary Fellow of Pembroke College Oxford. He has been JSPS Fellow at Institute of Industrial Science, Tokyo University (Japan), honorary professor of the University of Sydney, adjunct professor of the University of Western Australia, visiting professor of MIT, invited professor at EPFL (Switzerland), guest professor at TU-Delft (Netherlands), Carl Zeiss Visiting Professor at University of Jena (Germany), visiting professor at Warsaw University of Technology (Poland) and Lyle Fellow at University of Melbourne (Australia).

He has received several awards for his research, including an Alexander von Humboldt Research Award (at the Max Planck Institute for the Science of Light, Erlangen (Germany)), the Institute of Physics Optics and Photonics Division Prize, National Physical Laboratory Metrology Award, British Technology Group Academic Enterprise Award, Institution of Electrical Engineers Gyr and Landis Prize, and a commendation in the Prince of Wales Award for Industrial Innovation & Production.

He has served as vice-president of the International Commission for Optics (ICO), president of the International Society for Optics Within Life Sciences (OWLS), editor-in-chief of Journal of Optics A: Pure and Applied Optics, and editor of Advances in Optical & Electron Microscopy (Academic Press).

References

Alumni of the University of Cambridge
Alumni of the University of Oxford
Massachusetts Institute of Technology staff
Living people
Fellows of Pembroke College, Oxford
Academic staff of the University of Sydney
Fellows of St John's College, Oxford
Academic staff of the National University of Singapore
Year of birth missing (living people)